Vithana is a surname. Notable people with the surname include:

Harsha Vithana (born 1985), Sri Lankan cricketer
Kim Vithana (born 1969), English actress
Shehana Vithana (born 1999), Sri Lankan-Australian squash player